Serra Negra is a hill in the southeastern part of the island of Sal in Cape Verde. Its maximum elevation is 104 m, the highest point in southern Sal. It stretches for about 2.5 km along the east coast of the island, between the headland Ponta da Fragata in the south and the Ponta do Morrinho Vermelho in the north. The nearest settlement is Murdeira, to the west. The mountain forms part of a protected area as a nature reserve, important as nesting area for seabirds and turtles.

See also
 List of mountains in Cape Verde

References

Negra
Geography of Sal, Cape Verde
Protected areas of Cape Verde